& Yet & Yet is the third album by Canadian post-rock band Do Make Say Think. It was released on March 18, 2002 by Constellation Records.

"Chinatown" was featured on the soundtrack for Stephen Gaghan's Syriana.

Track listing 
All tracks written by Do Make Say Think

Personnel

Do Make Say Think
 Ohad Benchetrit – Writer, Performer, Producer, Engineer, Mixer
 Brian Cram – Horns
 Dave Mitchell – Writer, Performer, Producer
 James Payment – Writer, Performer, Producer
 Justin Small – Writer, Performer, Producer
 Charles Spearin – Writer, Performer, Producer, Engineer, Mixer

Additional musicians
 Brian Cram — horns
 Tamara Williamson – Vocals

References

External links 
 & Yet & Yet reviews at Constellation Records

2002 albums
Constellation Records (Canada) albums
Do Make Say Think albums